Super RTL is a German free-to-air television network owned by the RTL Group. The channel originally launched in 1995 as a joint venture between RTL Group predecessor company CLT-UFA and Disney's Buena Vista International Television Investments (later Disney International Operations) division.

History
On 24 August 1994, with Jeffrey Katzenberg's resignation, a reorganization of Disney Company took place in which Richard Frank became head of newly formed Disney Television and Telecommunications (DTT), which included Walt Disney Television International, which held Disney's Super RTL stake. The Luxembourgish CLT (owners of the German RTL channel) made a deal with Disney to form RTL Disney Fernsehen GmbH & Co. in 1995.

Super RTL
Super RTL was finally launched on 28 April 1995, with The New Adventures of Winnie the Pooh as its first ever program. The Disney-CC/ABC merger led to DTT being split up in April 1996, Walt Disney Television International was transferred to Capital Cities/ABC in that same month. CC/ABC combined the international units, Walt Disney Television International and ACIBG, into Disney–ABC International Television (DAIT) in July. Around the same time, in the 1990s, Bertelsmann ultimately came out on top after having gradually increased its stake in the German television channel RTL. Following a legal dispute with RTL/CLT, Bertelsmann announced plans to merge the television businesses of UFA to form the joint venture CLT-UFA in April 1996. A merger agreement was signed on 8 July 1996. It was approved by the CLT board of directors on 5 December, and the formation of CLT-UFA was completed on 14 January 1997. As a result, German television channels such as RTL Television and VOX and international broadcasting services, including M6 in France, were all brought together under one roof.

The Fun & Action Tour, a Germany-wide roadshow event for children, was started in 1997 featuring TV program characters. The tour was later renamed the Toggo Tour. The following year, the channel became the top view channel by the 3-to-13-year-old target age group.

In 1999, the joint venture saw its channel make a net profit of DM 4.5 million, launched its website and started the Super RTL Licensing Agency to make more revenues from TV licensing. A new managing director, Claude Schmit, took charge of the venture in 2000.

Also in 2000, the preschool programming is labeled "Toggolino". Toggolino Club is started in 2002 and offers paid pre-school children education content.

The Toggo umbrella brand was introduced in 2001 for all activities for 6- to 13-year-old children. In 2002, Sony BMG label, Berlin Records, released the first Toggo Music CD. SuperRTL began using the 'Family Cartoon' rating label in 2006 for family viewing suitable animated films shown on Friday and Saturday night.

In 2005, Super RTL was granted a broadcast license for the preschool pay-TV channel Toggolino TV by the government media regulators for young children between the ages of 3 and 6. However, Toggolino TV was never launched. Bertelsmann turned over the learning platform Scoyo to Super RTL in 2009. In mid-2013, Super RTL, RTL II and four other RTL channels were available over Zattoo live streaming service under the first deal between a German broadcaster and an over the top platform company.

Program contents' changes, and post-Disney era
With the announcement of the launch of a free-to-air German version of Disney Channel causing a loss of Disney programming, Super RTL signed volume deals in October 2013 with Warner Bros. Worldwide Television Distribution and Sony Pictures Television for a slate of animated features and DreamWorks Animation (DWA) for 1,200 hours of programming until 2020. The DWA deal included shows from the Classic Media library. The channel also acquired programming to expand its views in the evenings with more adult TV shows to debut in its fall 2014 schedule: ABC Family's Pretty Little Liars, ABC's Once Upon a Time and Scandal and Syfy's Lost Girl supernatural series. As of 1 January 2014, Disney programming left the channel, because the broadcast version of Disney Channel launched on 17 January. However, Disney continued to hold its stake in the station.

RTL Disney TV LP launched its Kividoo subscription video-on-demand (SVOD) services on 28 April 2015. In February 2016, RTL Disney Television LP received approval for a second channel from the anti-media concentration commission KEK. granted the 10-year license to the company. On 15 March, RTL Disney TV announced that the second channel's name as "Toggo plus" after receiving the broadcast license from media authorities' licensing and supervision commission ZAK. Toggo Plus was planned to launch on 4 June 2016. Super RTL continued to expand its Toggo brand with plans to launch Toggo Radio channel, the first German children and family friendly channel, at the end of May 2020.

On March 3, 2021, the RTL Group announced they had fully acquired Disney's stake in the station and the limited partnership, putting Super RTL under its full control for the first time. A rename to Toggo is on the cards.

Programming

Daytime
ALVINNN! and the Chipmunks
Angelo Rules
Barbie Dreamhouse Adventures
Barbie: It Takes Two
Blaze and the Monster Machines
Caillou
Cocomelon
Dino Ranch
DreamWorks Dragons: The Nine Realms
Inspector Gadget
Karate Sheep
Grizzy and the Lemmings
Jade Armor
Mr Bean: The Animated Series
Lego City Adventures
Mighty Express
Ninjago
Nate is Late
Pokémon Ultimate Journeys: The Series
Paw Patrol
Peppa Pig
Peter Rabbit
Petronix Defenders
Ranger Rob
Sally Bollywood: Super Detective
Scooby Doo and Guess Who?
SpongeBob SquarePants
Star Trek: Prodigy
Super Wings
New Looney Tunes
The Deep
Tom and Jerry
The Tom and Jerry Show
The Loud House
Wild Kratts
Woozle Goozle
Zak Storm
Zig and Sharko

Primetime
Bones
Columbo
CSI: Miami
Cain
House
Mr Bean
On the Case
Rizzoli and Isles
Snapped
The Stalker Files
Without a Trace

Programming blocks

Throughout the day, Super RTL is split into 3 different blocks:
Toggo (2001–present) is the network's children programming block and umbrella brand for 6- to 13-year-olds. In 2016, its brand and programming was added to a new network, Toggo Plus, while adding another hour in the morning. Toggo with this change, the block will be on 15 hours a day.
Toggolino airs shows aimed towards a pre-school audience (children aged 3 to 6). The brand was first used in 2000.

Related services
Kividoo: is a subscription video-on-demand (SVOD) services launched on 28 April 2015 with children's shows from Hollywood studio  DreamWorks Animation, Studio Hamburg, ZDF Enterprises, HIT Entertainment, BBC Studios and German publishing house Tessloff Verlag.
Toggo Plus: The Toggo Plus network would time shift Super RTL's Toggo programming block by an hour delay with the Toggo block added another hour in the morning. This network would add another hour after the block's schedule is completed. Infomercials would fill out the remaining time.
Toggo Radio: is an online only radio channel launched at the end of May 2020. The channel is on Super RTL platforms, online radio aggregators and smart devices, but not FM or Digital audio broadcasting initially. Content consists of chart music, children's songs and radio plays.

References

External links
  
Official Site of TOGGO TV 

Television stations in Germany
Television stations in Austria
Television stations in Switzerland
RTL Group
Mass media in Cologne
Television channels and stations established in 1995
Children's television networks
Former subsidiaries of The Walt Disney Company